Eunidia nebulosa is a species of beetle in the family Cerambycidae. It was described by Wilhelm Ferdinand Erichson in 1843. It is known from Australia, Senegal, Cameroon, Gabon, the Democratic Republic of the Congo, South Africa, Madagascar, Ethiopia, Ivory Coast, Kenya, Namibia, Angola, Niger, Saudi Arabia, Somalia, Mozambique, Tanzania, and Zimbabwe.

Subspecies
 Eunidia nebulosa australica Thomson, 1868
 Eunidia nebulosa nebulosa Erichson, 1843

References

Eunidiini
Beetles described in 1843